Sofia Padua Manzano (born 19 May 1971) is a Brazilian economist, professor and politician. She was the Brazilian Communist Party candidate for President in the 2022 Brazilian general election.

Electoral history

References 

|-

Living people
People from São Paulo
1971 births
Brazilian Communist Party politicians
Brazilian communists
Candidates for Vice President of Brazil
Candidates for President of Brazil
21st-century Brazilian women politicians
Brazilian women economists
Brazilian educators
Pontifical Catholic University of São Paulo alumni
State University of Campinas alumni
University of São Paulo alumni